Askeland is a village in Alver Municipality (formerly Radøy Municipality) in Vestland county, Norway. It used to be in the Radøy municipality before it merged into the new Alver municipality in 2020.

References

Villages in Vestland
Alver (municipality)